Nkonkobe Local Municipality was an administrative area in the Amatole District of the Eastern Cape in South Africa. The municipality is named after the Winterberg mountain range, Nkonkobe in isiXhosa. The seat, as well as most offices, of the Municipality are in Fort Beaufort, but the Council's chambers in Alice are generally used for council meetings, being better equipped. Other towns served by the municipality are Seymour, Balfour, Hogsback and Middledrift. After municipal elections on 3 August 2016 it was merged into the larger Raymond Mhlaba Local Municipality.

Main places
The 2001 census divided the municipality into the following main places:

Politics 
The municipal council consisted of forty-one members elected by mixed-member proportional representation. Twenty-one councillors were elected by first-past-the-post voting in twenty-one wards, while the remaining twenty were chosen from party lists so that the total number of party representatives was proportional to the number of votes received. In the election of 18 May 2011 the African National Congress (ANC) won a majority of thirty-five seats on the council.
The following table shows the results of the election.

References

External links
 Official website

Former local municipalities of South Africa